The Amy Fisher Story is a 1993 American television film dramatizing the events surrounding Amy Fisher's teenage affair with Joey Buttafuoco and her conviction for aggravated assault for shooting Buttafuoco's wife. The film was produced by ABC and originally aired on that network; in 1993 it was released on VHS and in 2001 on DVD.

The film stars 17-year-old Drew Barrymore as Amy Fisher. Anthony John Denison portrayed Joey Buttafuoco. It aired the same night and time as another movie on Amy Fisher starring Alyssa Milano for CBS.  The ABC film garnered higher TV ratings and critical praise than the CBS version.

Plot summary

The story begins in 1992, as Amy Fisher lies in a hospital bed with her mother sitting by her bedside. Earlier, she had attempted to commit suicide, but her parents caught her and took her to the hospital. As Amy rests in bed, she thinks back on her life over the last two years and her involvement with Joseph "Joey" Buttafuoco.

In 1991, Amy's parents bought her a brand new car for her sixteenth birthday. Amy loves the car, but her parents don't want her to take advantage by using it whenever she wants. After an argument with her parents, Amy spends her birthday at a friend's house. She had previously gone to a restaurant with them, and her father didn't like the fact that she was wearing such a revealing outfit (to keep the peace, Amy's mother told her outfit was lovely). She also flirted with the waiter, by looking at him with the corner of her eye, with a seductive smile on her face.

Amy gets into an accident, crashing her car. Her father takes her to Joey Buttafuoco's shop to get it fixed. She flirts with Joey lightly, asking him a lot of questions about his personal life. She begins crashing her car on purpose, using it as an excuse to see Joey again. Eventually, the two begin an affair. He is in his mid-thirties while she's in her teens (a minor). Amy becomes increasingly desperate about her relationship with Joey. She has strong feelings for him, and even though she knows he is married to his high school sweetheart Mary Jo Buttafuoco, she constantly wants to spend time with him. When he refuses to leave Mary Jo, Amy decides to hire someone to kill her. All her potential accomplices prove unwilling to get the job done, so Amy eventually decides to kill Mary Jo herself.

Amy goes to the Buttafuoco house and tells Mary Jo that Joey was cheating on her with Amy's younger sister. When Mary Jo expresses disbelief, Amy shows her the T-shirt that Joey gave her, but Mary Jo still doesn't believe Amy, saying that Joey gave that shirt to a lot of his customers. As Mary Jo is about to close the door on Amy, she takes out her gun and shoots Mary Jo in the head. The shot doesn't kill Mary Jo, but leaves her face partially paralyzed for life.

Joey realizes it was Amy who shot his wife. Mary Jo confirms this in a lineup. The reports of the shooting spread through the media and Amy is given the nickname "Long Island Lolita".

Eventually, in late 1992, Amy is sentenced to five to fifteen years in jail. Joey Buttafuoco is convicted of statutory rape in October 1993 and served six months in prison.

Reception
The critic Camille Paglia dismissed the film, calling it "meandering" and criticizing reviewers for hailing it as the best of the three films that were made about Amy Fisher.

References

External links
 

1993 television films
1993 films
1990s coming-of-age drama films
1993 crime drama films
ABC Motion Pictures films
Adultery in films
American coming-of-age films
American crime drama films
Drama films based on actual events
1990s English-language films
Films directed by Andy Tennant
Films scored by Michael Hoenig
Films set in 1992
Films set in Long Island
Crime films based on actual events
American drama television films
1990s American films